Beechcliff is a village in Staffordshire, England. For population details at the 2011 census see Swynnerton

Villages in Staffordshire